Rosendo García Montesinos (died 16 November 1939) was a Spanish alcalde and supporter of the Second Spanish Republic during the Spanish Civil War. He was executed by the government of Francisco Franco after the Nationalist victory.

References

Year of birth unknown
1939 deaths
Alcaldes of the Second Spanish Republic
People executed by Francoist Spain